Shilpa Singh is an Indian singer, dancer, model and beauty pageant titleholder. She was the runner-up at I AM She – Miss Universe India 2012. She represented India at the Miss Universe 2012 pageant at Las Vegas and became one of the semi-finalist after topping the interview preliminary competition with a score of 9.6/10.

Professional life 
Shilpa Singh graduated from Indian School of Business in 2019 and currently works with Google. She had earlier completed her B.Tech. in Computer Science from (SVKM's NMIMS), Mumbai. She works for cube26.

In October 2012, Singh replaced Urvashi Rautela, the original winner of I Am She 2012, who was found to be too young to compete.

References 

Indian beauty pageant winners
Living people
Miss Universe 2012 contestants
People from Samastipur district
1988 births
Female models from Bihar